This article highlights notable events occurring in Canadian television in 2004. In 2004, the Fine Living Channel (2004-2009) was introduced in Canada, and Tommy Douglas was named "The Greatest Canadian" by CBC, through public voting.

Events

Debuts

Ending this year

Changes of network affiliation

Deaths 
April 14 - Micheline Charest, English-Canadian television producer and founder of CINAR (b. 1953)

Television shows

1950s
Country Canada (1954–2007)
Hockey Night in Canada (1952–present, sports telecast)
The National (1954–present, news program)

1960s
CTV National News (1961–present)
Land and Sea (1964–present)
The Nature of Things (1960–present)
Question Period (1967–present, news program)
W-FIVE (1966–present, newsmagazine program)

1970s
Canada AM (1972–present, news program)
the fifth estate (1975–present)
Marketplace (1972–present, newsmagazine program)
100 Huntley Street (1977–present, religious program)

1980s
CityLine (1987–present, news program)
Fashion File (1989–2009)
Just For Laughs (1988–present)
On the Road Again (1987–2007)
Venture (1985–2007)

1990s
CBC News Morning (1999–present)
Cold Squad (1998–2005)
Da Vinci's Inquest (1998–2005)
Daily Planet (1995–present)
eTalk (1995–present, entertainment newsmagazine program)
Life and Times (1996–2007)
The Passionate Eye (1993–present)
The Red Green Show (1991–2006)
Royal Canadian Air Farce (1993–2008, comedy sketch series)
This Hour Has 22 Minutes (1992–present)
Yvon of the Yukon (1999–2005, children's animated series)

2000s
Andromeda (2000–2005, Canadian–American co-production)
Atomic Betty (2004–present, children's animated series)
Blue Murder (2001–2004)
Les Bougon (2004–2006)
Call for Help 2.0 (2004–2007, computer technical help series)
Canadian Idol (2003–2008)
CBC News: Sunday Night (2004–present)
Chilly Beach (2003–present, animated series)
Corner Gas (2004–2009)
Degrassi: The Next Generation (2001–present)
Edgemont (2001–2005)
Instant Star (2004–2008)
JR Digs (2001–present, comedy prank series)
Kenny vs. Spenny (2002–2010, comedy reality series)
Metropia (2004–2006)
Mutant X (2001–2004, Canadian-American co-production)
Naked Josh (2004–2006)
Odd Job Jack (animated series, 2003–present)
Paradise Falls (2001–present)
Puppets Who Kill (2002–2004)
ReGenesis (2004–2008)
Rick Mercer Report (2004–present)
6Teen (2004–present, animated series)
Slings and Arrows (2003–2006)
Sue Thomas: F.B.Eye (2002–2003, Canadian/American co-production)
This Is Wonderland (2004–2006)
Trailer Park Boys (2001–2008)
Train 48 (2003–2005)
What's with Andy (2001–2007, children's animated series)

TV movies
 Il Duce canadese

See also
 2004 in Canada
 List of Canadian films of 2004